Burnaby's Code or Laws, originally entitled Laws and Regulations for the better Government of his Majesty's Subjects in the Bay of Honduras, are an early written codification of the 17th and 18th century constitution and common law of the Baymen's settlement in the Bay of Honduras (later British Honduras). It was drafted by Sir William Burnaby or Joseph Maud, a Bayman, signed on 9 April 1765 at St. George's Caye, and subsequently confirmed by Sir William Lyttelton, governor of Jamaica.

History

Prelude

Distant  
The unwritten constitution and common law of the Baymen's settlement is commonly traced back to the introduction of buccaneering custom, upon the 1638 landing of a group of shipwrecked English buccaneers at the mouth of the Old River. Said constitution and common law eventually came to be known as 'the old custom of the Bay,' or 'Jamaica discipline.' It is often thought to have persisted largely unchanged throughout the 17th and early 18th centuries. It is now commonly contrasted with the contemporary constitution and common law of royal and chartered colonies in the West Indies and America, which are thought to have afforded settlers less or much less say in legislative, judicial, and executive matters.

Immediate 
A Spanish armadilla, under orders from the Governor of Yucatan, struck the English logging settlement in the Bay of Honduras on Christmas Day in 1759. Baymen were completely routed, and shortly evacuated the settlement, taking refuge in Mosquito Shore. Upon learning of their restoration via the 1763 Treaty of Paris, the exiled Baymen once again returned to the settlement, landing at the mouth of the Old River aboard five ships sometime in April 1763.

On 23 December 1763, Ramírez de Estenoz,
The Baymen, deeming Estenoz's actions a treaty violation, shortly petitioned the Governor of Jamaica and HM Government for redress, further publicising the affair in the press. On 8 February 1765, Hay captain, arrived at the settlement, under instructions 'for the Re-establishment of all the Baymen at their old Works in any Part of the Bay of Honduras, the most convenient for the cutting [of] Logwood.'

Creation 
Burnaby's Code is thought to have been drafted during March 1765, or during the first week of April 1765. Details of its creation are uncertain, though it is commonly thought to have involved little deviation from the custom of the Bay, being rather a written, explicit record of the settlement's 17th and 18th century constitution and common law. Authorship is commonly ascribed to William Burnaby, or to Joseph Maud. It was signed on 9 April 1765, most likely at St. George's Caye, by 85 Baymen, including two women and some unpropertied men.

Aftermath 
The Public Meeting met on 10 April 1765. Burnaby departed in late April 1764. Quarterly court was held on 30 May 1765. The Code was published in late 1765, and re-printed in 1809, as part of a digest of laws laid before the Public Meeting.

Content

Preamble 
Two paragraphs constitute the Code's preamble. The first part begins

The first part further
 binds the Baymen and their 'heirs, executors, and administrators, and assigns' to the Code's rules and regulations, 
 stipulates that sums received for breaches of these rules 'are to be appropriated for the use and benefit of the then inhabitants of the Bay,' and
 fixes the number of Magistrates to five, six, or seven (including at least two Justices of the Peace), all of whom 'shall be chosen by the majority of voices of the inhabitants then and there present.'
The second part introduces the articles, emphasising the first point aforementioned.

Articles 
The Code contains twelve articles.

First 
On blasphemy

The first article is enacted 'by and with the consent of the said inhabitants.' It prohibits 'profane cursing and swearing, in disobedience of God's commands, and the derogation of his honour,' making this a summary offence (subject to conviction by one JP) for which offenders would forfeit 'two shillings and sixpence, Jamaica currency, or the same value in merchantable unchipt logwood.'

Second 
On theft

The second article lacks an authorising clause. It prohibits theft and the aiding or abetting of it, making this a non-summary offence (triable by a quarterly court) for which offenders would be 'obliged to make restitution for the full value of the goods or effects so stolen, but be further subject to such other punishment and penalty as the said court shall adjudge.'

Third 
On inveigling crewmen

The third article lacks an authorising phrase. It prohibits inveigling sailors or crewmen, and harbouring, entertaining, employing, or concealing them without their shipmaster's written licence. Offenders would forfeit twenty tonnes of merchantable unchipped logwood, with the runaway sailor subject to summary conviction by a JP 'to be dealth with and punished as the said Justice shall judge his crime to deserve.'

Fourth 
On labour contracts

The fourth article is enacted 'for the better government of the said inhabitants, and in order to prevent as much as possible any disputes or disturbances which may arise therefrom.' It prohibits labour or service contracts by parole, requiring these to be in writing, and to state the agreed upon salary or wage, and 'where and in what manner it [salary or wage] is to be paid.' No penalty or punishment for breaches is mentioned.

Fifth 
On impressment

The fifth article lacks an authorising phrase. It prohibits impressment by parole, allowing only voluntary (non-impressed), written service contracts (as per the fourth article). The impressment of steersmen, for a single trip, is, however, exempted from the article. Breaches are made summary offences, with convictions subject to a penalty of ten tonnes of merchantable unchipped logwood, which are 'to be distributed agreeably to the tenor of these Articles.'

Sixth 
On taxation

The sixth clause lacks an authorising phrase. It authorises taxation in the following manner.
 The Public Meeting would appoint a committee of two JPs and five principal inhabitants to determine which taxes were 'necessary to be laid on the inhabitants of the Bay, for the use and benefit of the said inhabitants and settlers.'
 The tax committee would impose and collect taxes 'by the authority aforesaid [ie of the Public Meeting].'
The article further penalises defaults or non-payment with a fine of ten tonnes merchantable, unchipped logwood. Furthermore, default or non-payment of said fine is penalised by the offending party's being 'excluded the benefit of any advantage arising from the fines and forfeitures herein beforementioned, and intended for the uses and benefit of the said inhabitants.'

Seventh 
On quarterly courts

The seventh article is enacted 'In order for the better putting in execution the Articles and Regulations herein mentioned, and for the better government of the said inhabitants residing in the Bay.' It constitutes quarterly courts as follows.
 The courts are to 'try and determine any disputes which may arise among the inhabitants of the Bay.'
 Seven justices, appointed by Public Meeting, are to preside 'with the full power and authority from us [the inhabitants].'
 Sessions are to be held every three months at St. George's Caye.
 Trials are to be by 'a jury of thirteen good and lawful subjects, housekeepers of the Bay, [to] be chosen by the majority of the voices of the inhabitants of the Bay, then and there present.'
 The courts' determinations are to be final.
The articles further penalises non-compliance with the courts' sentences by forfeiture of property 'wheresoever it is to be found, of any kind whatsoever.'

Eighth 
On naval officers

The eighth article is enacted 'by and with the consent of the inhabitants of the Bay.' It vests Royal Navy officers with 'full power' to 'execute and enforce' the inhabitants' laws and agreements, and JPs' or courts' sentences, further requesting that officers exercise said authority.

Ninth 
On ad hoc courts

The ninth article is enacted 'by and with the consent of the inhabitants of the Bay.' It provides for the settling of 'disputes which may hereafter arise amongst the inhabitants of the Bay, not mentioned in these Regulations.' These are to be referred to an ad hoc court of two JPs and five principal inhabitants, whose determination is to be final. Of the five principal inhabitants, one is to be chosen by the JPs, and four by the parties in dispute.

Tenth 
On offences not explicitly treated

The tenth article has no enacting clause. It provides for all crimes and misdemeanours not mentioned in the Code. These are to 'be punished according to the custom of the Bay in like cases.'

Eleventh 
On legislation

The eleventh article is enacted 'for the better government of the inhabitants of the Bay, [...] by and with the consent of the whole of the inhabitants.' It binds inhabitants to 'all such laws and regulations as shall hereafter be made by the Justices of the Bay in full council; those laws and regulations being first approved of by the majority of the inhabitants of the Bay,' and to any fines, penalties, or forfeitures as imposed in said laws and regulations.

Twelfth 
On seizures upon a debtor's default

The twelfth article is enacted 'by and with the consent of the inhabitants of the Bay.' It prohibits creditors' seizure of a debtors' property (in case of default) without prior authority from the Justices of the Bay. Breaches are penalised by forfeiture of the debt, and further punishment 'as the Justice shall judge the party offending to deserve, agreeably to the tenor of these regulations.'

Signatures 
The Code closes as follows.

Analysis 

The code is commonly thought to have codified the settlement's pre-existing or prevailing legal customs, though it has been further suggested that Royal Navy rules and regulations partially influenced its content.

Legacy 

Burnaby has been credited with having 'put the settlement on a most respectable footing.' His lieutenant, who had been despatched to the Governor of Yucatan, in Merida, published an account of the voyage in 1769.

Burnaby's Code came to be 'celebrated' by Baymen and later British Hondurans as their 'charter of liberty.' It is commonly considered Belize's first written constitution, and has been deemed the first such to be signed by women. Scholarly opinion on Burnaby's Code is divided, with some deeming it insignificant, and others opining otherwise.

Notes

Citations

References

Code

Scholarship

Other 

 
 
 
 
 
 
 
 
 
 
 
 
 
 
 
 
 
 
 
 
 
 
 
 
 
 
 
 
 
 

17th century in Belize
18th century in Belize